Jakub Dyjas (born 9 October 1995) is a Polish table tennis player. He competed at the 2016 Summer Olympics in the men's singles event, in which he was eliminated in the second round by Alexander Shibaev, and as part of the Polish team in the men's team event. On club level he competes for Panathinaikos.

References

1995 births
Living people
Polish male table tennis players
Olympic table tennis players of Poland
Table tennis players at the 2016 Summer Olympics
Panathinaikos table tennis players
People from Koszalin
Table tennis players at the 2015 European Games
Table tennis players at the 2019 European Games
European Games competitors for Poland
20th-century Polish people
21st-century Polish people